The Office of Nuclear Energy (NE) is an agency of the United States Department of Energy which promotes nuclear power as a resource capable of meeting the energy, environmental, and national security needs of the United States by resolving technical and regulatory barriers through research, development, and demonstration.

The Office is led by the Assistant Secretary of Energy for Nuclear Energy, who is appointed by the President of the United States with the advice and consent of the United States Senate. The current Assistant Secretary of Energy for Nuclear Energy is Dr. Kathryn Huff.

Overview 
The Office of Nuclear Energy is guided by the following four research objectives detailed in its Nuclear Energy Research and Development Roadmap: 
 Develop technologies and other solutions that can improve the reliability, sustain the safety and extend the life of current reactors.
 Develop improvements in the affordability of new reactors to enable nuclear energy to help meet the Administration's energy security and climate change goals.
 Develop sustainable fuel cycles.
 Understand and minimize the risks of nuclear proliferation and terrorism.

Organization 
The Office is under the general supervision of the Under Secretary of Energy for Infrastructure. It is administered by the Assistant Secretary of Energy for Nuclear Energy (NE-1), who is appointed by the President of the United States. The Assistant Secretary is supported in running the Office by a politically appointed Principal Deputy Assistant Secretary and five career Deputy Assistant Secretaries. Each of the five Deputy Assistant Secretaries oversee a different branch of the Office's work. As of 2022, staffing and organization was as follows:

Assistant Secretary
Principal Deputy Assistant Secretary
Deputy Assistant Secretary – Nuclear Infrastructure Programs - Tracey Bishop
Deputy Assistant Secretary – Spent Fuel and Waste Disposition - Kim Petry (Acting)
Deputy Assistant Secretary – Nuclear Fuel Cycle and Supply Chain - Andrew Griffith
Deputy Assistant Secretary – International Nuclear Energy Policy and Cooperation - Aleshia Duncan 
Deputy Assistant Secretary – Reactor Fleet and Advanced Reactor Deployment - Alice Caponiti

Laboratory 
The Office of Nuclear Energy is the landlord of the Idaho National Laboratory (INL). INL is in southern Idaho, just west of the Eastern Snake River Plain.

INL is an applied engineering laboratory dedicated to supporting the U.S. Department of Energy's research of nuclear energy, national and homeland security, and clean energy. Past and current work includes initial development of: nuclear reactor designs, prototype reactors for the U.S. Navy, and technologies to manage nuclear waste. INL also conducts research supporting fuel cycle development, as well nuclear energy demos and deployments.

Lab history 
INL was established in 1949 as the "National Reactor Testing Station" by the Atomic Energy Commission. It is the location of historic Experimental Breeder Reactor Number I (EBR-I), which was the first nuclear reactor to generate usable electrical power.

CASL Hub 
The Consortium for Advanced Simulation of Light Water Reactors (CASL) was established in July 2010 as the first of five Department of Energy Innovation Hubs. It was administered by the Office of Nuclear Energy, and coordinated by Oak Ridge National Lab and INL. CASL had one goal: To develop a simulation environment that modeled the operation of an entire reactor down to the characteristics of a single fuel rod (which significantly exceeded the resolution available with existing industry tools). This simulation environment was named the Virtual Reactor. The Virtual Reactor was designed and built to provide solutions to a wide variety of reactor performance challenges.

In order to develop what was eventually called the Virtual Environment for Reactor Applications (VERA), it was necessary for CASL to conduct both basic research and technology development. Work of such scope and complexity was accomplished through a partnership of U.S. government, academia, and industry. In 2020, the CASL project concluded, making VERA available for licensing and deployment by the nuclear industry.

List of assistant secretaries 
The Assistant Secretary of Energy for Nuclear Energy is the head of the Office of Nuclear Energy. The assistant secretary is responsible for a budget of $1.626 billion as of fiscal year 2021. 
 Parties

 

Status

See also
 Advanced Fuel Cycle Initiative

References

Governmental nuclear organizations
Nuclear power in the United States
Nuclear history of the United States
Nuclear Energy, Office of
Government agencies with year of establishment missing